Rolling Fork can refer to some place names in the United States:

Rolling Fork (Arkansas), a river
Rolling Fork (Kentucky), a river, a branch of the Salt River
Rolling Fork, Mississippi, a city